"The Midnight Sun" is episode 75 of the American television anthology series The Twilight Zone.

Opening narration

Plot
The Earth's orbit has been perturbed, causing the planet to slowly fall into the sun. A prolific artist, Norma, and her landlady, Mrs. Bronson, are the last residents in their New York apartment building. Their former neighbors have either moved north to seek a cooler climate or they have already perished from the extremely high temperatures.

Norma and Mrs. Bronson try to support each other as they watch life as they know it erode around them. The streets are deserted, water usage is limited to an hour a day, and their electricity is gradually being turned off. Food and water are scarce and the sea has dried up. A radio presenter announces that the police have been moved out of the city and that citizens must defend themselves against looters, then angrily goes off script before being forcibly taken off the air.

Norma burns her hand on a windowsill. Mrs. Bronson becomes psychologically unstable, beseeching Norma to paint a picture of a cool subject, rather than Norma's usual paintings of the sun and burning cities. A looter enters the building through the roof door, which Mrs. Bronson neglected to lock. They hide in Norma's apartment. The looter calls from outside, demanding entry. Norma threatens him with a revolver, and they hear him walk away.

Against Norma's pleas, Mrs. Bronson unlocks the door, and the stranger forces his way in, grabs the revolver and drinks their water. He calms down after seeing their distress and begs for their forgiveness, claiming that he is an honest man driven insane by the heat. He throws away the revolver and describes the recent death of his wife and newborn child. He begs for forgiveness until Norma acknowledges him; he then leaves the building.

In an attempt to console Mrs. Bronson, Norma shows her an oil painting of a waterfall cascading into a lush pond. Mrs. Bronson deliriously claims that she can feel the coolness and splashes in the imaginary waters before dying from heat stroke. Norma sits in shock as the thermometer surges past  and shatters. The paint on the paintings begins to melt; she screams and collapses.

The scene cuts to the same apartment at night with heavy snow outside the windows. The thermometer reads . Norma, who has been bedridden with a high fever, is being cared for by a doctor and Mrs. Bronson. The Earth moving closer to the sun is revealed to be only a fever dream, while in reality the Earth is moving away from the sun, and the world's inhabitants are actually freezing to death.

Closing narration

Production notes
The effect of the oil paintings melting was accomplished by painting the pictures in wax on the surface of a hotplate. Moreover, the episode was shot in the summer, on a set without air-conditioning, with the director actually turning up the heat on certain key scenes to create the necessary mood and appearance for the story.

Deleted characters
Serling's original script featured two characters who did not appear in the completed episode: a police officer and a refrigerator repairman.

"I spent a lot of time with Buck Houghton, Twilight Zone's producer trying to reduce scripts, some by Rod, by one speaking part or two speaking parts because we were just about to start shooting the show and we were over budget. And Aubrey was really tough on this subject even if it were a small number of dollars." —Del Reisman quoted in Serling: The Rise And Twilight of Television's Last Angry Man.

Critical response
J. Hoberman, excerpt from "America's Twilight Zone", published in Visions From the Twilight Zone by Arlen Schumer:
Whether explicitly nuclear or otherwise, the apocalypse was never far away [in the Twilight Zone]. "The Midnight Sun" was telecast on the day the U.S. consolidated its drive for "push-button warfare" with the first successful launching of a Minuteman missile from an underground silo. The episode substitutes a kink in the Earth's orbit—an analogue to what we currently call "the greenhouse effect"—for an atomic holocaust. Instead of blowing up, the planet is falling into the sun. Rape and pillage seem imminent, and even the pigment is boiling on the heroine-artist's canvases as the radio weatherman goes nuts on the air.

Other media
 The radio version of The Twilight Zone featured a modernized version of this episode starring Kim Fields.
 In 2009 the original episode was adapted as a graphic novel, "Rod Serling's The Twilight Zone: The Midnight Sun", by Mark Kneece and Anthony Spay.

Notes

References
Sander, Gordon F.:Serling: The Rise And Twilight of Television's Last Angry Man. New York: Penguin Books, 1992.
Zicree, Marc Scott: The Twilight Zone Companion. Sillman-James Press, 1982 (second edition)
DeVoe, Bill. (2008). Trivia from The Twilight Zone. Albany, GA: Bear Manor Media. 
Grams, Martin. (2008). The Twilight Zone: Unlocking the Door to a Television Classic. Churchville, MD: OTR Publishing.

External links

1961 American television episodes
Climate change in fiction
The Twilight Zone (1959 TV series season 3) episodes
Television episodes written by Rod Serling
Television episodes about nightmares
Television episodes about dreams